The Phosphoria Formation of the western United States is a geological formation of Early Permian age.

The Phosphoria includes phosphorite beds that are an important source of phosphorus. Many of its shales are rich in organic matter and are petroleum source rocks, and some of its dolomites include petroleum reservoirs.

Environment of deposition
The Phosphoria Formation was deposited under marine conditions in a foreland basin located between the Paleozoic continental margin and the North American cratonic shelf. The upwelling of cold, nutrient-rich marine water at that time stimulated the growth of plankton and nekton, resulting in the accumulation of organic matter on the sea floor.  That, coupled with low rates of clastic and carbonate sedimentation, led to the high phosphate and hydrocarbon content of the formation, as well as elevated levels of cadmium, chromium, copper,  fluorine, molybdenum, nickel, rare earth elements, selenium, uranium, vanadium, and zinc.

Stratigraphy and lithology
The formation is commonly subdivided, from the top downward, as follows:
 The Tosi chert member (chert with limestone at base).
 The Retort phosphatic member (phosphorite, dolomite, and siltstone).
 The Rex chert member (gray limestone at base, black chert, and black cherty shale).
 The Meade Peak phosphatic member (interbedded brown to black shale, gray dense limestone, dark brown oolitic phosphorite, and minor white calcareous sandstone).
 The Lower Chert member (dark cherty shale).

The Phosphoria is underlain by the Pennsylvanian-Permian Casper Formation or, depending on the location, by the Park City Formation or the Tensleep Sandstone, and it is overlain by the Triassic Dinwoody Formation. The upper boundary is placed at the top of the uppermost phosphorite bed and below the tan calcareous siltstone of Dinwoody formation. The lower boundary is marked by a thin phosphorite that contains abundant fish scales and bones.

Thickness and distribution
The formation reaches its greatest thickness in the Sublett Range in the Paleozoic cordilleran structural basin of southern Idaho. Within the basin the formation consists of a basal phosphorite overlain by a thick sequence of chert and cherty sandstone. To the east in western Wyoming the Phosphoria gradually decreases in thickness and is intertongued with carbonate rocks of the Park City Formation and redbed sandstones of the Chugwater Formation of Permian to Triassic age. The Phosphoria units extend into the Wind River Mountains and pinch out in the Green Mountains to the east.

Paleontology

Fossils recovered from the Phosphoria Formation include brachiopods, sponge spicules, crinoid stems, conodont elements, and fish scales and bones. Most "tooth whorls" of the enigmatic cartilaginous fish Helicoprion are known from the formation, including the only known specimen with preserved cranial remains. The Early Permian age of the formation is based primarily on conodont biostratigraphy.

Economic resources

Phosphorus
The Phosphoria phosphorite beds have been mined for phosphorus, which is used primarily for fertilizer production, in southeastern Idaho, northern Utah, western Wyoming, and southwestern Montana.

Uranium
Low concentrations of uranium are present in the Phosphoria phosphorite beds but are not considered to be of economic interest.

Vanadium
A vanadium-enriched zone that is present in western Wyoming and southeastern Idaho contains potentially economic concentrations of vanadium in some areas.

Petroleum
Petroleum has been produced from some of the dolomites in the Phosphoria Formation, and many of the Phosphoria shales are rich in organic matter and are petroleum source rocks.

See also
Phosphate mining in the United States

References

Shale formations of the United States
Geologic formations of Idaho
Geologic formations of Montana
Geologic formations of Wyoming
Geology of the Rocky Mountains
Permian geology of Nevada
Permian Idaho
Permian geology of Montana
Permian geology of Utah
Permian Wyoming
Cisuralian Series of North America